Central Energy Trust Arena is the current name of the 180,000 square metre publicly owned recreational complex just west of the Palmerston North city centre in the Manawatū-Whanganui region of New Zealand.

It has three linked indoor stadiums, with movable tiered seating. Outdoor facilities include football fields and a speedway track with grandstand.

In June 2015, FMG insurance chose not to renew the sponsorship deal for the main Stadium name.

History
Originally founded in 1886 as the Palmerston North Showgrounds, its pavilion burnt down in a fire in 1977. It was replaced with a new stand and the ground was reopened in 1981 as the Manawatu Sports Stadium. Since 1973 it has been owned by the Palmerston North City Council.

Arena 1: Central Energy Trust Arena

Capacity
Central Energy Trust Arena has a capacity of 15,000. Temporary seating is added for major events allowing the capacity to reach 20,000.

Central Energy Trust Arena is home to Manawatu Rugby. It is home ground of the Manawatu Turbos, and also generally hosts one club game per week. Playing in the Air New Zealand Cup, crowd attendances at Turbos' games have been among the highest in the competition, averaging 7,000 per game.

History
Central Energy Trust Arena was formerly known as Arena 1 and FMG Stadium. It was the venue for the first ever Super 12 rugby match in 1996, which was played by the Wellington Hurricanes and the Auckland Blues.

The Stadium was the host of the 1987 Rugby World Cup game between Wales and Tonga on 29 May. Wales won 29–16.

The ground was a venue for the British & Irish Lions on the 2005 British & Irish Lions tour to New Zealand with a game against Manawatu Turbos on 28 June.

On 28 March 2009, The Highlanders played a Super Rugby 'home' game at Central Energy Trust Arena against the Bulls. The game attracted a large crowd of over 10,000 -- one of the Highlanders' biggest of the 2009 season.

On 4 September 2011, The Manawatu Turbos hosted the Hawkes Bay Magpies in the ITM Championship Cup Final at Central Energy Trust Arena. Crowd attendance was 13,100.

The stadium hosted two pool games in the 2011 Rugby World Cup, in which New Zealand was the host nation. With the city's central location, large student population, the stadium's close proximity to the CBD, International Pacific College, as well as the New Zealand Rugby Institute (a facility in which the All Blacks used to use), the idea of basing a team and having a pool game in Palmerston North was attractive.

On 18 March 2016, The Hurricanes played another Super Rugby 'home' game at Central Energy Trust Arena against the Western Force. The game attracted a crowd of over 8,000.

Rugby league
The stadium hosted its first rugby league test match when New Zealand lost to Great Britain 11–10 on 24 June 1990 in front of 8,073 fans.

The stadium hosted New Zealand Kiwis' victory in their first rugby league test of the 1992 Great Britain Lions tour of Australia and New Zealand. In front of 11,548 fans, the Kiwis defeated Great Britain 15-14 after a late Daryl Halligan field goal.

Palmerston North also hosted the second game of the 1993 Trans-Tasman series against Australia, played on a water-logged ground after constant rain. Despite the arctic like conditions, an overflow crowd of 19,000 hardy fans saw the Mal Meninga led Aussies run out 16-8 winners.

Overall, the stadium hosted six test matches between 1990 and 1996. Its last test to date saw New Zealand defeat Great Britain 18–15 on 25 October 1996 in front of 12,000 fans.

Rugby league Test matches
List of Test matches played at Palmerston North.

Other sports
Other users of the stadium include the Robertson Holden International Speedway, with the  speedway track encircling the field. The national Teams Championships have been held there, early February bringing racers from all over the country. The season starts mid-October and finishes by the start of May.

The YoungHeart Manawatu association football team used to play at the ground, however they have since moved to Memorial Park, Palmerston North.

Central Energy Trust Arena hosted the Wellington Phoenix association football team in a home game against Sydney FC on 12 December 2009 in the Hyundai A-League.

Central Energy Trust Arena was twice host of Te Matatini nationwide Kapa haka competition.

Arena 2
Redeveloped in 2004, Arena 2 is a multipurpose indoor sporting facility, capable of holding exhibitions, conventions and entertainment events. It has been the host of the Central Pulse home matches in Palmerston North and International netball fixtures between New Zealand and Australia; international motor shows; conferences and houses the home court to the Manawatu Jets who play in the New Zealand National Basketball League. The arena has also played host to international basketball, hosting the New Zealand Tall Blacks on occasions including the FIBA Oceania Championship. For sponsorship reasons, the arena is known as the Fly Palmy Arena.

Arenas 3, 5, and 6
Arena 3 has a floor area of 2100 sq m and is an indoor sports centre. It has a capacity of 2,000 persons.

Arena 5 includes Bell Hall, Barber Hall, Waldegrave Lounge and gym.

Arena 6 has the Outdoor. No. 2, 3 & 4 sports grounds.

B&M Centre
The B&M Centre is a multipurpose indoor stadium.

Military Use 
The Palmerston North Showgrounds have had a long military association, which saw it recognised as a Place of Remembrance by the Palmerston North City Council and the New Zealand Poppy Places Trust in 2019.

From the early 1900s the Palmerston North Showgrounds was the venue for various Military Tournaments, with Boxing Day Military displays popular with the local community. Examples of Military Tournaments held at the Palmerston North Showgrounds were:

 2 February 1901, the Imperial Representative Corps paraded in the Square with the Manawatu Mounted Rifles and the Palmerston North Rifles.  The parade concluded at the Showgrounds with military displays.
 9 November 1908, The Wellington Engineer Volunteers participated in a Military Tournament at the show grounds where they engaged in an improvised bridge-building display.
 3 January 1911, a large Naval and Military Tournament took place at the Palmerston North Showgrounds with crowds numbering 7,000 to 8,000.

During the 1st World War the showgrounds were used as a remount depot for the New Zealand Mounted Rifles and as a stop-over location for men passing through Palmerston North as they transited to other various military camps around New Zealand.

On 19 July 1919, the showgrounds were the venue for Palmerston Norths celebrations marking the end of World War One. After a parade around the Square followed by speeches watched by a crowd of about 7,000 including 800 children from all the local schools.

During the Second World War the Showgrounds were requisitioned for military use for the duration of the war by the New Zealand Army, and was by the following units:

 The 28th (Māori) Battalion was formed at the Showgrounds on 25 January 1940, and after initial training for three months en-trained at the Palmerston North Railway Station on 2 May 1940 for overseas service,
 The Manawatu Mounted Rifles,
 Headquarters 2 Brigade,
 Headquarters 4 Division,
 No 2 Company, New Zealand Army Service Corps, and 
 No 2 Ordnance Sub Depot, New Zealand Army Ordnance Corps from 1942 to 1945.

On 31 December 1944 a large fire occurred in the building occupied by Ordnance Depot, destroying Halls 1, 2, and 3 and causing stock losses of £225,700 ($18,639,824.86 at 2018 value), including around 1500 Charlton Automatic Rifles, a successful New Zealand conversion of obsolete Lee–Metford and Lee–Enfield rifles into an automatic rifle.

References

Indoor arenas in New Zealand
Boxing venues in New Zealand
Athletics (track and field) venues in New Zealand
Speedway venues in New Zealand
Netball venues in New Zealand
Rugby union stadiums in New Zealand
Sports venues in Palmerston North
Basketball venues in New Zealand
Association football venues in New Zealand